Mountain Home Public Schools is a school district headquartered in Mountain Home, Arkansas, United States.

History
On July 1, 1986, the Oakland School District consolidated into the Mountain Home School District.

Schools
 Secondary education
 Mountain Home High School Career Academies (10–12)
 Mountain Home Junior High School (8–9)
 Pinkston Middle School (6–7)
 Guy Berry Career and Alternative School (7–12)

 Early childhood and elementary education
 Hackler Intermediate (3–5)
 Nelson–Wilks–Herron Elementary School (1–2)
 Kindergarten Center

References

Further reading
These include maps of predecessor districts:
 (Download)

External links
 Mountain Home Public Schools

Education in Baxter County, Arkansas
School districts in Arkansas